Brahmaloka (Sanskrit: ब्रह्मालोक, IAST: Brahmāloka) or Satyaloka (Sanskrit: सत्यलोक) is the abode of Brahma, the creator god, a member of the Trimurti along with Vishnu and Shiva, along with his consort Saraswati. It is also referred to as Brahmapura, in the Puranas. Brahmaloka, described to be 60,000,000 miles above the Prajapati loka and is considered to be of great soteriological significance.  The sphere where its inhabitants never again know death, dwelling perpetually in the company of yogins, and drinking the excellent nectar of yoga.

Location 
In the center of Brahmaloka is Brahmapura, a huge palace where Brahma resides.

Description 
Brahmaloka is a realm composed entirely of Brahman, considered superior to the Svarga loka and is full of immortal energy, knowledge and bliss. It is also known as the planet of the Bhagavān.

The above statement shows that Brahmaloka is an eternal Vaikuntha that is neither created nor located within the material realm and is a home for the Supreme Soul.

The Chāndogya Upaniṣad says in 8:1

Buddhism 
In Buddhism, Brahmaloka refers to the highest celestial worlds, the abode of the Brahmas. It consists of twenty heavens, namely:

 the nine ordinary Brahma-worlds,
 the Vehapphala 
 the Asaññasatta
 the five Suddhāvāsā,
 the four Arūpa worlds,

All except the four Arūpa worlds are classed among the Rūpa worlds (the inhabitants of which are corporeal). The inhabitants of the Brahmaloka are free from sensual desires. Brahmaloka consists only of higher devas or higher celestial beings called Brahmas and rebirth in the Brahma world is the result of great virtue due to meditation. The Jataka tales also contain various instances of ascetics who practiced meditation, being reborn after death in Brahmaloka. Furthermore, it is believed that while the rest of the world will be destroyed at the end of a kappa, the Brahmaloka will survive and that the first beings to be born on Earth come from the ābhassara Brahma world. The Brahmās here are represented as visiting earth and taking an interest in the affairs of men. This is why Nārada descends from the Brahmaloka to dispel the heresies of King Angati in the Lord Brahma-Nārada tale in the Mahanipata Jataka.

See also
Vaikuntha
Brahman
Paramatma
Bhagavan
Mount kailash

References

Literature 
  Self-Realization Brahmaanubhava: The Advaitic Perspective of Shankara: Brahmaanubhava: The Advaitic Perspective of Shankara (Cultural Heritage and Contemporary Change. Series Iiib, South Asia, V. 4) von Vensus A. George von Council for Research in Values & (Januar 2001) - page 103
 Sharma, Shubhra. Life In The Upanishads. Abhinav Publications; 1 edition (February 14, 2011)
 chhandogya upanishad as PDF
 Twitchell, Paul (1988) The Far Country. Illuminated Way Publishing.  
 Twitchell, The Far Country as PDF

External links 
 Brahmapura

Locations in Hindu mythology
Hindu cosmology